The IBM ThinkPad 701 is a subnotebook series from the ThinkPad line by IBM consisting of the 701C and 701Cs models based on the Intel 486. The 701 is colloquially known as the Butterfly due to its sliding keyboard, which was designed by John Karidis. The 701 was the most sold laptop in 1995 and has received 27 design awards. The 701 was discontinued because the keyboard design was no longer a necessity after screen sizes increased.

Background

Development 
The 701 was a collaboration project between the manufacturing facility at the Research Triangle Park near Raleigh, North Carolina in the US and the development facility at IBM Yamato in Japan. The concept of the keyboard was first developed as a photocopy of a keyboard in spring 1993. In the summer, a plexiglass prototype was developed. The decision to fund the notebook was made in the fall of 1993, with the introduction planned a year later. Because the process was delayed, it used the Intel 486 instead of the faster Pentium when it was released. The keyboard was designed by with John Karidis, Sam Lucente and Robert Tennant. Richard Sapper has been responsible for the overall ThinkPad design. Other contributors include Lawrence Stone, Michael King, Martin Tucker and Gerard McVicker.

The 701 was codenamed butterfly internally at IBM, and engineers also wanted to use this name as the official one. The IBM legal department did not allow the name of living creatures for products. It was part of the subnotebook series like the ThinkPad 500, but they did not want to attach the same name to this model due to bad sales of the previous 500 model. The 600 series was a reserved name, so they used the 700 series which was intended for the high-end models.

IBM bought advertising space in major newspapers, in the lower corner or on the upper right side of a page. They only used an image of a butterfly without anything else. Days later, they added the IBM logo with a butterfly icon. A couple of days later, the text "Watch for the announcement" was added.

After the announcement, IBM received a legal threat about the usage of the name "butterfly" by someone known only as George, as it violated their company's trademark on a supercomputer product named Butterfly. IBM replied that they did not plan to use it as a brand name, and no legal action or further correspondence took place.

Specifications 

The subnotebook series was released in different variations, with either the Intel DX2 or Intel DX4, LCD with dual scan or TFT active matrix. They were sold with different disk sizes. They all contained the same graphics chips and preinstalled software, except for the DX4 versions which were dual booted with IBM OS/2. It was based on the AT bus and could be extended with a Dock II type.

Keyboard 

Officially known as the TrackWrite, but commonly known and code-named as the butterfly keyboard, is a foldout laptop computer keyboard designed by John Karidis for IBM. It allowed the 701 series to be both compact (when closed) and comfortable to use (when open), despite being just 24.6 cm (9.7 in) wide with a 26.4 cm (10.4 in) VGA LCD.

The butterfly keyboard is split into two roughly triangular pieces that slide as the laptop's lid is opened or closed. As the lid is opened both pieces slide out to the sides, followed by one piece sliding downward. The two halves mesh to form a keyboard 29.2 cm (11.5 in) wide which overhangs the sides of the laptop body. Conversely, as the lid is closed one piece slides back, then both slide inward until the keyboard can be covered by the lid. The movement of the keyboard is driven by a cam on the lid's hinge, so the motions of the keyboard parts are always synchronized with the movement of the lid.

Reception 
In a 1995 review of the 701C by InfoWorld the full-sized keyboard, large matrix screen and built-in multimedia features were positively noted. The nonstandard I/O ports were seen negatively. The ThinkPad 701 has received 27 design awards, including the "Good Design Award" from CES Innovation and "1995 Product of the year" in the subnotebook category from InfoWorld. Domus noted in a 2019 article that: "Even today, this portable PC amazes anyone who sees it open and close, and more than twenty years have gone by.". The 701C was the top selling laptop of 1995. Walt Mossberg considered it the most unusual and clever laptop he ever reviewed. The laptop is still popular with collectors, 26 years after its release. 

According to John Karidis, the IBM ThinkPad 700 succeeded because of the large screen size and full-sized keyboard, while other companies cramped their keyboards and failed. Karidis observed that the limiting factor in the laptop size was the keyboard width and that the screen and keyboard surface were equal with different aspect ratios.

The laptop is being displayed in the design collection of the Museum of Modern Art in Manhattan, New York, Die Neue Sammlung in Munich, Germany and in the Computer History Museum. The ThinkPad 701 was briefly shown in 1995 James Bond film GoldenEye, Blood Diamond and Mission: Impossible.

Discontinuation 
The 701 series was discontinued on 21 December 1995. This was due to newer laptop models containing larger screens, so the laptop could contain a full sized keyboard without a folding mechanism. Other companies were also moving to Pentium processors. The 701 series has been described as a product that had innovative features that were well received in the market, but the total package missed the competitive mark.

Further developments 

A few months after the release of the 701, the ThinkPad 760 was released which is based on the original Intel Pentium processor.

Third party modifications 
In 2014 it was reported by Hackaday that it was possible to desolder the original Intel DX4 and replace it with a faster Am5x86. In 2023, hacker Karl Buchka retrofitted the mainboard of the Framework Laptop into the 701. The keyboard is controlled using the QMK firmware on a Teensy.

Modern version speculation 
In 2003, ZDNet reported that the IBM Design Center was experimenting with new laptop models that included a butterfly keyboard. David Hill stated that he tried to bring back the butterfly design, but was not able to do so.  In 2021, Lenovo has filed a patent for a keyboard that is similar to the one used in the 701.

After the release of the Lenovo ThinkPad 25th Anniversary Edition in 2017, Antonio Villas-Boas from Business Insider has argued that Lenovo (who took over the ThinkPad line from IBM) should also bring back the butterfly keyboard design.

See also 
 Ergonomic keyboard
 List of computer size categories
 List of IBM products

References

Book sources

External links 

 
 Hardware maintenance manual
Patent US6262881B1 - Compact notebook computer with movable keyboard section
Official website - IBM.com
Craig's IBM Butterfly Page
 The Butterfly (in Japanese)
 
 Commercial by IBM
 Japanese IBM ThinkPad 701C brochure
Battery replacement guide
Remembering the ThinkPad 701C
 IBM Thinkpad 701C Factory Restore Disk Image with OS/2 Warp and Windows 3.1
IBM ThinkPad 701C, Complete Restoration!

IBM laptops
Computer keyboard models
ThinkPad